"I'm So Fly" is the second single released by American rapper Lloyd Banks, from his debut album, The Hunger for More (2004).

Background
"I'm So Fly" was released on July 13, 2004. It was produced by Timbaland and Danja.

Music video
The music video to the song was directed by Jessy Terrero. It features cameos from G-Unit affiliates 50 Cent, Young Buck, DJ Whoo Kid and Olivia.

Charts

Release history

References

2004 singles
2004 songs
Lloyd Banks songs
Song recordings produced by Danja (record producer)
Song recordings produced by Timbaland
Songs written by Lloyd Banks
G-Unit Records singles
Interscope Records singles
Songs written by Timbaland
Songs written by Danja (record producer)